Eupithecia decipiens is a moth in the family Geometridae. It is found in Afghanistan, Iran, Uzbekistan and Kyrgyzstan. It is found at altitudes between 1,500 and 2,900 meters.

References

Moths described in 1910
decipiens
Moths of Asia